Helen Smith is an English novelist and dramatist. She is a member of the Mystery Writers of America, English PEN and the Crime Writers Association. She lives in Brixton, London.

Biography 
Helen Smith is a novelist and playwright who lives in London. She has one daughter, Lauren, with the writer Damon Rochefort. When her daughter was small, they travelled extensively in Australia, South East Asia, Hong Kong and South America before returning to the UK where her first novel, Alison Wonderland, was published.

Helen Smith was a winning writer in the IRDP London Playwrights Festival and was the recipient of an Arts Council Award for The Miracle Inspector. Her novels have been optioned for development by the BBC. She volunteers as a writing mentor with the Write to Life group run by the Medical Foundation for the Care of Victims of Torture.

Bibliography 
Novels
 2014 Beyond Belief (Emily Castles Mystery)  
 2013 Invitation to Die (Emily Castles Mystery) 
 2012 The Miracle Inspector 
 2011 Showstoppers  
 2010 Three Sisters  
 2000 Being Light 
 1999 Alison Wonderland 

Short Stories
 2014 Purple, Silver, Olive, Orange 
 2014 The Memory Man 
 2014 Real Elves 

Children's Books
 2004 Pirates, Swashbucklers & Buccaneers of London 
 2002 Grave-Robbers, Cut-throats & Poisoners of London 

Anthologies
2016 Killer Women Crime Club Anthology 978-1527200715
2014 The London Stories 
2014 Six Pack of Sleuths ASIN B00N9HTAPC
2013 Naughty or Nice ASIN B00HBZ1KY2
2009 Freed Speech: Modern Poetry in Translation Series 3 No. 12

Theatre 
2010 The Memory Man Arcola Theatre, London 
2009 Purple, Silver, Olive, Orange Arcola Theatre, London 
2007 The Psychic Detective National Theatre Watch This Space  and touring

Radio drama 
1995 Looking for Baby Jesus

References

External links 
 author page at Inkwell Management
 author page at Orion
 Helen Smith's website
 Helen Smith's blog
 'Why I Blog' article in UK Writer, WGGB magazine
 'All about ebooks' podcast for WGGB
 Modern Poetry in Translation

1968 births
21st-century English novelists
People from Brixton
People from Clapham
Living people
English dramatists and playwrights